Artem Yuriyovych Bondarenko (born 21 August 2000) is a Ukrainian professional footballer who plays as a midfielder for Shakhtar Donetsk in Ukrainian Premier League.

Career
Bondarenko is a product of the different youth sportive schools, who signed a professional contract with FC Shakhtar Donetsk in the Ukrainian Premier League in 2020.

He played in the Ukrainian Premier League Reserves and made his debut for Shakhtar Donetsk in the Ukrainian Premier League in a losing match against FC Vorskla Poltava on 1 March 2020.

Career statistics

References

External links
 
 

2000 births
Living people
Sportspeople from Cherkasy
Piddubny Olympic College alumni
Ukrainian footballers
Ukraine youth international footballers
Ukraine under-21 international footballers
Association football midfielders
FC Shakhtar Donetsk players
FC Mariupol players
Ukrainian Premier League players